USS Somersworth (PCE(R)-849) was a United States Navy PCE(R)-848-class Patrol Craft Escort (Rescue), in commission from April 1944 to September 1965. The ship was named after the city of Somersworth, New Hampshire.

Role
Each ship of the PCER-848 class was an armed rescue ship built on the hull of the PCE (Patrol Craft Escort) by the Pullman-Standard Car Manufacturing Company in Chicago, Illinois. The ships were to serve three missions: damage control / firefighting; casualty treatment / evacuation; and patrol / guardship. Each ship's hospital contained 65 beds, with a surgical suite, and X-ray facilities. The medical department consisted of a staff of 11 doctors and hospital corpsmen.

Three ships of the class—PCER-848, -849 and -850—were refitted and their hospital spaces converted into communications centers to support the US Army's activities in the Pacific Theater.

Service history
The ship was laid down on 24 September 1943 by the Pullman-Standard Car Manufacturing Company of Chicago, launched on 31 January 1944, and commissioned as USS PCE(R)-849 on 11 April 1944. The ship was at the Battle of Leyte Gulf in October 1944. It was also present at the surrender of Japan in Tokyo Bay on 2 September 1945, and was the first American ship to dock post-war at the Port of Tokyo. The ship received three battle stars for service during World War II.

From 1946 to 1965, the ship was stationed at New London, Connecticut, at the Naval Underwater Sound Laboratory. The ship was named USS Somersworth on 15 February 1956.

The blast was attributed to the premature detonation of explosives used for underwater sound tests. The four seriously injured crew members were transferred to the nearby RMS Queen Mary, which was en route from New York City to England, and later transported to Newport, Rhode Island, by the USS Sunbird. One injured seaman had to have his left leg amputated. The Navy later issued dereliction of duty letters to the ship's commander and gunnery officer.

In 1959, the ship was reclassified as EPCE(R)-849, an Experimental Patrol Craft Escort (Rescue). The ship was decommissioned in September 1965 and was struck from the naval register on 1 April 1966. It was later sold, and then scrapped in 1972 at Portsmouth, Virginia.

Legacy
USS Somersworth Park is located in the city that the ship was named for—Somersworth, New Hampshire—at the intersection of Main Street and Market Street. A memorial to crew members who served on the ship is located in Stein Park on Main Street.

On July 17, 2004, a reunion of 32 personnel who had served on the ship, including four former captains, was held in Somersworth.

See also
 USS Fairview PCE(R)-850

References

External links 
Somersworth content at Naval History and Heritage Command

PCE(R)-848-class patrol craft
1944 ships
Somersworth, New Hampshire
Ships built in Chicago